T. J. Lee III (born March 20, 1991) is an American professional Canadian football defensive back for the BC Lions of the Canadian Football League (CFL).

College career
Lee played college football for the Eastern Washington Eagles from 2010 to 2013. He played in 49 games where he recorded 182 tackles, four interceptions, and seven forced fumbles.

Professional career
Lee signed with the BC Lions on May 22, 2014. In his first season with the Lions Lee played in 8 games and contributed 24 tackles, 1 interception and 2 forced fumbles. He had a breakout season in 2015 when he played in 17 games and totaled 80 tackles, three sacks and four interceptions. Lee missed most of the following season after suffering an Achilles injury in late July. He was re-signed by the Lions only days before hitting the open market as a free agent in February 2017. Lee returned to a prominent role within the Lions defense in 2017, playing in 15 games, contributing 49 tackles, and four interceptions.

Lee was once again re-signed to a contract extension before becoming a free agent in February 2018. He became a CFL All-Star in 2018 with 81 tackles, three interceptions, two forced fumbles, and one touchdown. In 2019, he was the BC Lions Most Outstanding Defensive Player after contributing with 66 defensive tackles, six special teams tackles, four interceptions, and one forced fumble. 

Lee returned to the Lions following the cancelled 2020 season and played in all 14 regular season games in the shortened 2021 season. He was once again a major component of the team, amassing 71 defensive tackles, 12 special teams tackles, four interceptions and one forced fumble. On January 11, 2022, he signed another contract extension with the Lions. On July 29, 2022, Lee played in his 100th regular season game, in a match against the Saskatchewan Roughriders.

References

External links
BC Lions profile

Living people
Eastern Washington Eagles football players
BC Lions players
Canadian football defensive backs
Players of American football from Houston
Players of Canadian football from Houston
American players of Canadian football
American football defensive backs
West Seattle High School alumni
1991 births